Dialogue Proposition Action (DPA-Mwangaza) was a political party in the Comoros led by Mohamed Saïd Abdallah Mchangama.

History
The party received 5.4% of the vote in the 1992 elections, winning seats in the Assembly of the Union.

In October 1993 it merged into the Rally for Democracy and Renewal, which went on to win the parliamentary elections in December.

References

Defunct political parties in the Comoros
Political parties disestablished in 1993
1993 disestablishments in the Comoros